College Green is a three-sided plaza in the centre of Dublin, Ireland. On its northern side is the Bank of Ireland building, which until 1800 was Ireland's Parliament House. To its east stands Trinity College Dublin. To its south stands a series of 19th-century buildings.

Streets leading onto College Green are Dame Street to the west, Grafton Street to the south, and Westmoreland Street to the north. College Green has been used as an assembly point for major political rallies. In the mid-1990s, United States President Bill Clinton addressed a crowd during his visit to Ireland. President Barack Obama also spoke at the site in a major address during his visit in May 2011.

History and layout

The area was once known as Hoggen Green and named after the nunnery of Blessed Virgin Mary del Hogges constructed at this location in 1156 by Diarmaid mac Murchadha. The name "Hoggen" derives from the Old Norse word haugr meaning  mound, or barrow. The cemetery at College Green consisted of several burial mounds, which are thought to have contained the remains of some of the Norse kings of Dublin.

Between Church Lane and Suffolk Street, the Norse had their Thing, an assembly and meeting place, which was still to be seen in the 17th century. All along College Green, called  Hoggen Green by the English, lay their barrows. Hoggen gave its name to the convent of St Mary de Hogges, which stood roughly where the Bank of Ireland is now and was a major landowner in the area until the Reformation. Originally laid out as a triangular green, it is now a rough trapezoid. The site has been historically used in celebration, with newly appointed Viceroys of Ireland being welcomed on the street.

Trinity College was founded on the street's east side in 1592. The west front's facade was designed by Theodore Jacobsen and added in 1751. Several public monuments stand in College Green, including a 19th-century statue facing the college of old Irish Parliament member Henry Grattan, designed by John Henry Foley.

A statue of King William III of England on horseback was constructed in the centre of College Green in 1701 by Grinling Gibbons. The statue was historically the site of celebrations marking the King's birthday on 4 November, with a procession through the city and a parade around the statue. These celebrations were recorded by Mary Delany, who wrote that the King was "idolized here almost to superstition." After the formation of the Orange Order in 1795 and the Rebellion of 1798, the statue was a centre for fervour on both sides. The statue was routinely decorated with orange ribbons and lilies, with the railings painted orange, but it was also frequently defaced, painted with pitch and there was one attempt to remove the head. The statue also featured in James Joyce's story "The Dead". The statue continued to be attacked and defaced numerous times through the 19th and 20th centuries, leading to many repairs. The annual parades and processions ceased in 1823. It was eventually taken down after 277 years when it was badly damaged in an explosion on 11 November 1928, Armistice Day, with the head having been stolen in 1929. The area was the temporary site of an air raid shelter during World War II. The fountain, by Edward Delaney, features four figures with trumpets which represent the four provinces of Ireland.

In 1966, a statue of the poet and nationalist Thomas Davis was constructed in the centre of College Green, to mark the fiftieth anniversary of the Easter Rising. The design includes a fountain designed by Edward Delaney.

Architecture

Chichester House was constructed by Arthur Chichester, 1st Baron Chichester in the early 17th century. It was subsequently adapted for the Irish Parliament around 1670, and replaced by a new Parliament House in 1729, designed by Edward Lovett Pearce. It was later enlarged by James Gandon in 1787 and Edward Parke between 1804 and 1808. The site is now the Bank of Ireland.

Daly's Club, a gambling house and club founded by Patrick Daly in 1750, moved to the space on College Green between Foster Place and Anglesea Street at numbers 2–5 in 1769. It closed in 1823 and the centre portion is now taken up by shops.

Number 6-8 was formerly the site of the Jury's Hotel. It opened in 1839 as a commercial lodging house, and was rebuilt in 1859 and 1882. The premises was sold when Jury's relocated to Ballsbridge. The contents were auctioned, with the ornate mahogany bar sold to a buyer in Zurich. The site was bought by Patrick Gallagher in July 1979, who demolished the hotel in 1980 and built a granite-clad office block designed by Burke-Kennedy Doyle and Partners in its place, which was used by Telecom Éireann. The remodelled building now forms part of the Central Plaza development by Hines.

The Ulster Bank headquarters on College Green was built in the late 1970s. Despite objections from groups like the Dublin Civic Group, a collection of mostly Victorian buildings which faced onto College Green, Suffolk Street and Church Lane were demolished in 1976 to make way for the new development. The high-domed Victorian façade on College Green was kept, but the interior was entirely remodelled.

Guinness Mahon moved from South Frederick Street to numbers 16–17 in 1854. The current building was constructed in 1931 by G&T Crampton for the Bank. The Bank subsequently moved to St Stephen's Green.

Politics

College Green is commemorated in Francis Wheatley's painting Dublin Volunteers on College Green, which shows the Irish Volunteers demonstrating for independence on 4 November 1779.

Bill Clinton, the President of the United States visited Dublin in December 1995 and gave speech in College Green to 80,000 people. In May 2011, President Barack Obama gave a speech at College Green in front of 100,000. During the speech, he praised Ireland for its economic opportunities, and said he was proud of his Moneygall heritage.

Traffic restriction
Since July 2009, College Green, during peak times on working days, has been accessible only to pedestrians, buses, taxis and cyclists.

In 2016, plans were published for College Green to be fully pedestrianised, apart from a public-transport lane along the Trinity College side, to create a large public space in front of the Bank of Ireland. Dublin City Council announced that a joint team of Dixon Jones and Paul Keogh Architects would be responsible for redesigning the space. The plans drew several protests from store owners, taxi drivers and bus operators. In October 2018 An Bord Pleanála, the state planning agency rejected the plan. The Green Party-led Dublin City Council banned traffic for three Sundays in summer 2019 in order to test the feasibility of further traffic restrictions.

See also
Statues in Dublin
List of streets and squares in Dublin
Dublin College Green (UK Parliament constituency)

References

Notes

Sources

 
 
 
 

Squares in Dublin (city)
Streets in Dublin (city)